James Henry Moore (3 June 1891 – 25 January 1987) was an Australian rules footballer who played with Melbourne and Essendon in the Victorian Football League (VFL).

Notes

External links 

1891 births
1987 deaths
Australian rules footballers from Victoria (Australia)
Melbourne Football Club players
Essendon Football Club players